"If You Can’t Hang" is a song by American rock band Sleeping with Sirens. The song is from the band's second studio album, Let's Cheers to This. It was released as the album's third single on September 14, 2011. One of the band's most successful songs, the single was certified platinum by the RIAA in May 2022.

Composition
"If You Can't Hang" is about three different relationships and the lessons learned from them. Quinn came up with the pre-chorus while waiting before a show in San Francisco, with the rest of the song following shortly after. The track runs at 192 BPM and is in the key of D minor. The band performed the song live at the 2014 Alternative Press Music Awards.

Reception
"If You Can't Hang" has been seen as a highlight track from Let's Cheers to This. Oliver Thompson of "Dead Press!" said "This continues into the incredibly catchy 'If You Can't Hang…', whose chorus is catchier than the common cold."

Music video
The music video for "If You Can't Hang" was released on September 14, 2011. The video was directed by Thunder Down Country and showcases the band playing in a room.

Personnel
Sleeping with Sirens
 Kellin Quinn – lead vocals
 Jesse Lawson – rhythm guitar, backing vocals
 Justin Hills – bass guitar, backing vocals
 Gabe Barham – drums
 Jack Fowler  – lead guitar

Production
Kris Crummett – producer

Charts

Certification

References

2011 singles
Rise Records singles
2011 songs
Sleeping with Sirens songs